is a Japanese Paralympic archer.

Hirasawa began archery in 1996 and she made her international debut in 2003.

She completed at the Paralympic Games in 2004, where she won a bronze medal in the individual W1/W2 event, and in 2016.

References

1972 births
Living people
Japanese female archers
Paralympic archers of Japan
Paralympic bronze medalists for Japan
Archers at the 2004 Summer Paralympics
Medalists at the 2004 Summer Paralympics
Archers at the 2016 Summer Paralympics
Paralympic medalists in archery
Sportspeople_from_Saitama_Prefecture
21st-century Japanese women